Wilbrandia is a genus of flowering plants belonging to the family Cucurbitaceae. It is also in Tribe Coniandreae.

It is native to Brazil, Paraguay and north-eastern Argentina.

Known species
As accepted by Plants of the World Online:

The genus name of Wilbrandia is in honour of Johann Bernhard Wilbrand (1779–1846), a German anatomist and naturalist. He was a proponent of Naturphilosophie. 
It was first described and published in Enum. Subst. Braz. page 30 in 1836.

References

Cucurbitoideae
Cucurbitaceae genera
Plants described in 1836
Flora of Brazil
Flora of Paraguay
Flora of Northeast Argentina